Ann Burton (1933–1989) was a Dutch singer.

Ann or Anne Burton may also refer to:

 Ann Burton (Ann of the Airlanes), a fictional character
 Ann Burton (abortion rights activist) (born 1960)
 Anne Burton (writer), pen name of Sara Woods

See also 
 Burton (surname)